Strawberry is a census-designated place (CDP) and an unincorporated district of Marin County, California,  United States. It shares a ZIP code (94941) with Mill Valley (hence, addresses in Strawberry are listed as "Mill Valley") and falls within its school districts; however, it is considered within the sphere of influence of the town of Tiburon. It is separated from Mill Valley by U.S. Route 101. Its population was 5,447 at the 2020 census.

Geography
Occupying Strawberry Point that extends into Richardson Bay, it is bordered to the east by Tiburon, to the west by Mill Valley, and to the north by unincorporated Alto. To the south, across the west arm of Richardson Bay, are Marin City and Sausalito. U.S. Route 101 forms the western edge of Strawberry, with the highway leading north  to San Rafael, the county seat, and south  over the Golden Gate Bridge to San Francisco.

Aramburu Island is separated from Strawberry by Richardson Bay.

Ring Mountain, holding significant evidence of Native American habitation, dominates the high ground east of Strawberry on the Tiburon Peninsula.

Strawberry Spit was once the gathering site of harbor seals, who previously lived and fished here, but after development on the spit began in the 1980s they left.

Strawberry is the site of a major transfer bus stop for Golden Gate Transit.

Demographics

2010
At the 2010 census 5,393 people, 2,510 households, and 1,307 families resided in the CDP. The racial makeup of the CDP was 80.2% White (76.1% non-Hispanic), 10.9% Asian, 2.1% African American, 0.3% Native American,  0.3% Pacific Islander, 1.8% from other races, and 4.3% from two or more races. 6.5% of the population was Hispanic or Latino of any race.

The census reported that 95.4% of the population lived in households, 4.5% lived in non-institutionalized group quarters, and 0.1% were institutionalized.

Of the 2,510 households 25.5% had children under the age of 18 living in them, 41.0% were opposite-sex married couples living together, 8.0% had a female householder with no husband present, and 3.1% had a male householder with no wife present. 4.6% of households were unmarried opposite-sex partnerships and 0.8% were same-sex married couples or partnerships. 40.6% of households were one person and 14.3% were one person aged 65 or older. The average household size was 2.05 and the average family size was 2.80.

The age distribution was 19.9% under the age of 18, 4.2% aged 18 to 24, 27.7% aged 25 to 44, 30.8% aged 45 to 64, and 17.5% 65 or older. The median age was 44.0 years. For every 100 females, there were 90.8 males. For every 100 females age 18 and over, there were 86.5 males.

There were 2,729 housing units of which 39.2% were owner-occupied and 60.8% were occupied by renters. The homeowner vacancy rate was 1.4%; the rental vacancy rate was 2.4%. 44.2% of the population lived in owner-occupied housing units and 51.2% lived in rental housing units.

2000
At the 2000 census there were 5,302 people, 2,435 households, and 1,246 families in the CDP. The racial makeup of the CDP in 2010 was 76.1% non-Hispanic White, 2.1% non-Hispanic African American, 0.2% Native American, 10.9% Asian, 0.3% Pacific Islander, 0.3% from other races, and 3.5% from two or more races. Hispanic or Latino of any race were 6.5%.

Of the 2,435 households 23.9% had children under the age of 18 living with them, 41.4% were married couples living together, 7.2% had a female householder with no husband present, and 48.8% were non-families. 38.8% of households were one person and 9.4% were one person aged 65 or older.  The average household size was 2.08 and the average family size was 2.79.

The age distribution was 18.7% under the age of 18, 4.7% from 18 to 24, 35.2% from 25 to 44, 29.9% from 45 to 64, and 11.4% 65 or older.  The median age was 40 years. For every 100 females, there were 93.8 males.  For every 100 females age 18 and over, there were 90.0 males.

The median household income was $70,432 and the median family income  was $99,409. Males had a median income of $70,298 versus $46,336 for females. The per capita income for the CDP was $50,581.  About 4.0% of families and 7.1% of the population were below the poverty line, including 6.5% of those under age 18 and 2.9% of those age 65 or over.

Educational institutions
Strawberry is home to one public school, Strawberry Point School (K - 5). Golden Gate Baptist Theological Seminary closed its Strawberry campus in 2016 after many decades of operation. Strawberry is in the Mill Valley School District, the Tamalpais Union High School District and the Marin Community College District.  Strawberry is in the attendance areas for Mill Valley Middle School and Tamalpais High School.

Strawberry Point School
Strawberry Point School opened in 1952. Starting in 1956, 6th and 7th grade students attended Alto Junior High School, until Edna Maguire Junior High School opened in 1957.  Edna Maguire is now an elementary school. Starting in 1969, 6th, 7th and 8th grade students attended Mill Valley Middle School.  Strawberry Point School closed in 1990 and reopened in 2000.  Huey Lewis attended Strawberry Point School in the 1950s, where he skipped second grade.

The song "Mill Valley", recorded in 1970 and released on the album Miss Abrams and the Strawberry Point 4th Grade Class , became a nationwide hit.  (Listen to a clip of  "Mill Valley".)

Golden Gate Baptist Theological Seminary
The site of the Golden Gate Baptist Theological Seminary on Strawberry Point, now known as the Seminary at Strawberry, was considered for the headquarters for the United Nations. This was because in the 1940s when the UN was established in San Francisco, Strawberry was undeveloped. It was seen as a tranquil and peaceful setting. New York City was eventually chosen.

Government
Strawberry is unincorporated, receiving most of its general government services from Marin County. It is in the 3rd Supervisorial District and, is represented by Supervisor Kate Sears. 

The Strawberry Recreation District provides limited services in the area, including recreation facilities.  It has an elected board of five directors. District boundaries do not exactly match those of the CDP.

Strawberry is in the Southern Marin Fire Protection District, which also serves Tamalpais Valley, Homestead Valley, Almonte, Alto, part of the Town of Tiburon, and, since 2004, the City of Sausalito.  Prior to the creation of the District in 1999, Strawberry was in the Alto-Richardson Fire Protection District.

Strawberry shares a ZIP code (94941) with Mill Valley (hence, addresses in Strawberry are listed as "Mill Valley") and falls within its school districts. However, it is considered within the sphere of influence of the town of Tiburon, and there have been several unsuccessful ballot measures to incorporate into Tiburon. In the 1960s, before the creation of "Sphere of Influence" as a legal concept, there had been several other attempts to incorporate Strawberry into Mill Valley, but these too were voted down by Strawberry residents.

Notes

External links
 Strawberry Recreation District
 Golden Gate Transit

Census-designated places in Marin County, California
Mill Valley, California
Census-designated places in California
Populated coastal places in California